Allan "Whitey" Snyder (August 7, 1914 – April 16, 1994) was an American Hollywood make-up artist and is best remembered as the personal make-up artist of Marilyn Monroe.

Career
Allan Snyder began his long career as a makeup artist in 1948. He first began his career as an assistant make-up artist on the film The Walls of Jericho.

Whitey Snyder was Marilyn Monroe's makeup artist throughout her career: from her first screen test at Twentieth Century Fox in 1946 to her funeral makeup in 1962. The pair developed a very close working relationship. Towards the end of her life, Monroe asked Snyder to prepare her face if she were to die before him. This was a promise that he fulfilled, after her death in August 1962. Snyder was also a pall-bearer at her funeral.

For his work, Snyder was twice nominated for Primetime Emmy Awards, under the category of Outstanding Achievement in Make-Up. These nominations came in 1978, for his work on the TV Biopic Marilyn: The Untold Story and in 1981, for Little House on the Prairie. His last project was the 1984 television series, Highway to Heaven which he worked on from 1984 to 1987.

Death
Snyder died on April 16, 1994, in Hansville, Washington. He was survived by his wife, costumer Marjorie Plecher, who had also worked as the wardrobe director on several of Marilyn Monroe's films.

Filmography

References

External links
 

1914 births
1994 deaths
American make-up artists
Artists from California
People from California
20th-century American musicians